Elaine Bromka (born January 6, 1950) is an American actress.  She is known for cowriting the one-woman play Lady Bird, Pat & Betty: Tea for Three with Eric H. Weinberger, in which Bromka portrayed First Ladies Lady Bird Johnson, Pat Nixon and Betty Ford.  She is also known in film for playing Cindy Russell in Uncle Buck (1989).  Bromka also played Gloria in the 2011 film In the Family.  She has also appeared on television shows including Days of Our Lives, The Sopranos, Sex and the City and ER as well as on Broadway in such productions as The Rose Tattoo, I'm Not Rappaport and Macbeth.  Bromka won a New England Emmy Award for her work in the television special Catch a Rainbow.

Bromka is from Montclair, New Jersey.

Select filmography
Without a Trace (1983)
Uncle Buck (1989)
In the Family (2011)
Archaeology of a Woman (2012)
Theresa Is a Mother (2012)
Happy Yummy Chicken (2016)

References

External links
 
 
 

Living people
American stage actresses
American television actresses
American film actresses
20th-century American actresses
21st-century American actresses
People from Montclair, New Jersey
Actresses from New Jersey
1950 births